Red Hulk is an alias that is used by different fictional characters appearing in American comic books published by Marvel Comics. While the first two were created from members of the United States army, the third one is a form of Hulk's Joe Fixit personality.

Fictional character biography

Thunderbolt Ross
The first incarnation of Red Hulk (also known as Rulk) first appeared in the Hulk series that debuted in 2008. The 2010 "World War Hulks" storyline reveals that this being is United States Army General Thunderbolt Ross, the father-in-law and longtime nemesis of the original Hulk, Bruce Banner. The story line reveals that Ross was given the ability to transform into Red Hulk by the organizations A.I.M. and the Intelligencia and that he did this in order to better fight the original Hulk.

Robert Maverick
The origin of the second Red Hulk appears in the 2017 debut issue of U.S.Avengers. Four-star General Robert Maverick is selected for his genetic profile to create a being who is "halfway to a Hulk". A device called the Hulk Plug-In, created by Avengers Idea Mechanics (a legitimate technology company created from the remnants of the defunct supervillain organization Advanced Idea Mechanics), is implanted in Maverick's wrist. When triggered, it turns him into a variation of Red Hulk for one hour approximately every day and a half. Unlike the Thunderbolt Ross version of Red Hulk, Maverick retains his mustache in his Hulk form and wears his sunglasses. He joins the U.S. Avengers.

Joe Fixit
Hulk's Joe Fixit personality later gained the ability to transform into his version of Red Hulk form when in the Below-Place.

Other versions
The 2015 "Secret Wars" story line tells of an unidentified Red Hulk called the Red King, the Baron of the Battleworld domain of Greenland. A variation of Captain America called the Captain is sent into Greenland by God Emperor Doom and Sheriff Strange to kill Red King, who is holding Bucky Barnes prisoner. After the Red King reveals to that group that he already killed Barnes, the Captain kills the Red King.

Powers and abilities
Red Hulk has superhuman strength, durability, and endurance, comparable to that of the Hulk. He is capable of absorbing radiation, which his body can metabolize for increased strength. Unlike the Hulk, increased anger does not make him stronger but emit increasing heat. The upper limit of this heat has not been specified. When fighting the Hulk, during Red Hulk's first story line, this heat created an aura of light around the two behemoths and melted the desert sand on which they stood into a glass disc at least dozens of feet in diameter. At this level, Red Hulk weakens and is vulnerable to being knocked unconscious by the Hulk.

Collected editions

References

Set index articles on comics
Marvel Comics mutates
Fictional characters with superhuman durability or invulnerability
Marvel Comics characters with superhuman strength
Marvel Comics superheroes
Marvel Comics supervillains
Hulk (comics)
Comics characters introduced in 2008